Krivoye Ozero may refer to:
Krivoye Lake, a lake in Chelyabinsk Oblast, Russia
Kryvoye Ozero (village), a village (selo) in the Republic of Tatarstan, Russia
Kryve Ozero, an urban-type settlement in Mykolaiv Oblast, Ukraine